Václav Klement (October 16, 1868, Velvary – August 13, 1938, Mladá Boleslav) was a Czech automotive pioneer, co-founder of Laurin & Klement, what is now Škoda Auto.

Early life
Klement had an unhappy childhood. His mother died when he was young, and he was raised by his stepmother. From the age of 14 he worked manual jobs, but was also a good student, and became an apprentice in a bookshop in the town of Slaný while finishing his secondary studies.

After some time working in Prague, Klement moved to Mladá Boleslav, where he worked in another bookshop. When the owner of the bookshop died Klement bought it, but the business did not prosper and Klement had to sell the bookshop to pay off his debts.

Laurin & Klement
Together with Václav Laurin, Klement started a business repairing bicycles, based on Klement's business acumen and Laurin's technical knowledge. In 1895, they founded the Laurin & Klement Company, producing their own bicycles, known as Slavia bicycles. In 1899 they went on to produce motorcycles, which were sold both domestically and on the international market, and used in sport competitions. In 1902 Laurin & Klement motorcycles were successful in the Paris—Vienna race, the only motorcycles which were able to complete the 1430 km race without any breakdowns in 31 hours.  

Soon the company stopped producing bicycles to focus on the production of motorcycles. By 1903 the company had around 200 employees and was producing around 2,000 motorcycles each year. In 1905 the company started making cars, and in 1907 it expanded, registered on the stock exchange, and stopped motorcycle production. 
 
In 1925 the Laurin & Klement Company joined the Pilsner Škoda Concern and the name of the factory was changed to Laurin & Klement - Škoda, subsequently only Škoda.

See also
 Laurin & Klement

References

External link

20th-century Czech businesspeople
European founders of automobile manufacturers
Czech automotive pioneers
Škoda people
People from Kladno District
1868 births
1938 deaths
19th-century Czech businesspeople